Valentino Vujinović (born 20 February 1999) is a German professional footballer who plays as a forward for Bosnian Premier League club Solin.

References

External links

1999 births
Living people
Footballers from Karlsruhe
German footballers
Association football forwards
Germany youth international footballers
2. Bundesliga players
3. Liga players
Luxembourg National Division players
Second Football League (Croatia) players
Karlsruher SC II players
Karlsruher SC players
FSV Frankfurt players
FC Differdange 03 players
NK Solin players
NK Široki Brijeg players
Premier League of Bosnia and Herzegovina players
German expatriate footballers
German expatriate sportspeople in Luxembourg
Expatriate footballers in Luxembourg
German expatriate sportspeople in Croatia
Expatriate footballers in Croatia
German expatriate sportspeople in Bosnia and Herzegovina
Expatriate footballers in Bosnia and Herzegovina